The 2010 Nicholls State Colonels football team represented Nicholls State University as a member of the Southland Conference during the 2010 NCAA Division I FCS football season. Led by first-year head coach Charlie Stubbs, the Colonels compiled an overall record of 4–7 with a mark of 3–4 in conference play, placing sixth in the Southland. Nicholls State played home games at John L. Guidry Stadium in Thibodaux, Louisiana.

Schedule

References

Nicholls State
Nicholls Colonels football seasons
Nicholls State Colonels football